Anton Viktorovich Borodachev, born 23 March 2000) is a Russian right-handed foil fencer and 2021 team Olympic silver medalist.

Medal record

Olympic Games

World Cup

References

2000 births
Living people
Russian male fencers
Olympic medalists in fencing
Olympic fencers of Russia
Fencers at the 2020 Summer Olympics
Medalists at the 2020 Summer Olympics
Sportspeople from Samara, Russia
Twin sportspeople
Russian twins
Olympic silver medalists for the Russian Olympic Committee athletes
21st-century Russian people